Events from the year 2011 in Nepal.

Incumbents
President: Ram Baran Yadav 
Prime Minister: 
 until 6 February: Madhav Kumar Nepal 
 6 February-29 August: Jhala Nath Khanal
 starting 29 August: Baburam Bhattarai 
Vice President: Parmanand Jha
Chief Justice: Ram Prasad Shrestha (until 5 May), Khil Raj Regmi (starting 5 May)

Incumbents
 29 August - Baburam Bhattarai became Prime minister.

Deaths
 4 March - Krishna Prasad Bhattarai, former Prime Minister

References

 
Nepal
Years of the 21st century in Nepal
2010s in Nepal
Nepal